The Hairstons: An American Family in Black and White, written by historian Henry Wiencek, was published in 1999 by St. Martin's Press, and won the National Book Critics Circle Award in Biography.

References

1999 non-fiction books
St. Martin's Press books
National Book Critics Circle Award-winning works
Hairston